The 1985 St. Louis Cardinals season was the team's sixty-sixth season in the league. The team failed to improve on their previous output of 9–7, winning only five games. This was the third straight season in which the team did not reach the playoffs. The Cardinals fired head coach Jim Hanifan the following season when the Cardinals finished in last place after a 3-1 start.

Personnel

Staff

Roster

Schedule

Standings

References

1985
St. Louis Cardinals